Anthony Derek Jordan  (born 1934) is a former English badminton player who won numerous international titles from the mid-1950s through the late 1960s.

Biography
Known for his quick and deceptive racket work, Tony Jordan was primarily a doubles specialist with his greatest success coming in mixed doubles. Between 1956 and 1968 Jordan shared four mixed doubles titles with three different partners at the prestigious All-England Championships.<ref>Pat Davis, The Guinness Book of Badminton (Enfield, Middlesex, England: Guinness Superlatives Ltd., 1983) 108.</ref> He played on seven successive English Thomas Cup (men's international) teams between 1951 and 1970.

Jordan won the gold medal at the 1968 European Badminton Championships in mixed doubles with Susan Whetnall. He was appointed Member of the Order of the British Empire (MBE) in the 1970 Birthday Honours for services to badminton.

In later life, he partnered Welsh comedian Rhod Gilbert for leisurely play in West London. He appeared on an episode of Would I Lie to You?'' where Gilbert told this story.

References 

English male badminton players
1934 births
Living people
Commonwealth Games silver medallists for England
Badminton players at the 1966 British Empire and Commonwealth Games
Members of the Order of the British Empire
Commonwealth Games medallists in badminton
Medallists at the 1966 British Empire and Commonwealth Games